"Old" is a song by American heavy metal band Machine Head from the album Burn My Eyes. It was released as a single in March 1995 and is also available on the band's live albums Hellalive and Machine Fucking Head Live.

Track listing

Digipack yellow cover version
 "Old" – 4:08
 "Death Church (Convent Mix)" – 6:28
 "Old (Eve of Apocalypse Mix)" – 6:01
 "The Rage to Overcome" (Demo version) – 5:05

Digipack white cover version
 "Old" – 4:07
 "Davidian" (Live) – 7:25
 "Hard Times" (Live Cro-Mags cover) – 2:28
 "Death Church" (Demo version) – 6:16

Promo version
 "Old" – 4:07
 "Alans on Fire" (Poison Idea cover) – 4:00
 "Davidian" (Live) – 7:25
 "Hard Times" (Live Cro-Mags cover) – 2:28

Charts

References

1994 songs
1995 singles
Machine Head (band) songs
Roadrunner Records singles
Songs critical of religion
Songs written by Robb Flynn
Songs written by Logan Mader
Songs written by Adam Duce